is a sub-kilometer asteroid, classified as near-Earth object and potentially hazardous asteroid of the Apollo group, approximately  in diameter. It safely passed 1.27 lunar distances from Earth on 31 October 2015 at 17:01 UTC, and passed by Earth again in November 2018.

Discovery

The asteroid was first observed on 10 October 2015 by Pan-STARRS at an apparent magnitude of 20 using a  Ritchey–Chrétien telescope. The asteroid was not discovered sooner because it spends most of its time beyond the orbit of Mars, has a large orbital inclination, and is usually well below the plane of the ecliptic.  The asteroid last passed within  of Earth on 29 October 1923 and will not pass that close again until 1 November 2088.

The media has nicknamed the asteroid the "Great Pumpkin" after the animated Halloween television special It's the Great Pumpkin, Charlie Brown,  "Spooky", the "Halloween Asteroid", and the "Skull Asteroid" due to its skull-like appearance following radio frequency images taken at Arecibo Observatory and closest approach coincidentally occurring on Halloween day.

2015 flyby 

On 31 October 2015 the asteroid passed  from the Moon and then passed  from Earth.

The next object this large known to pass this close to Earth is  that will pass about 1 lunar distance from Earth on 7 August 2027. It is estimated that there are about 2400 near-Earth asteroids 300–500 meters in diameter, of which about 1100 have been discovered.

During closest approach to Earth the asteroid reached about apparent magnitude 10, which is much too faint to be seen by the naked eye. Even at peak brightness, the asteroid was a challenging target for amateur astronomers with small telescopes, best seen in the Northern hemisphere. The glare from an 80% waning gibbous Moon also hindered observations.

At 11:00 UT the asteroid was in the constellation of Taurus about 9 degrees from the Moon and moving at a rate of 3.4 degrees per hour. At the time of closest approach of 17:00 UT the asteroid was in the constellation of Ursa Major about 56 degrees from the Moon and moving at a rate of 14.7 degrees per hour. After closest approach it quickly became too faint and too close to the Sun in the sky to be seen.

2018 flyby 

After it had been unobservable for almost three years,  was recovered on 7 October 2018 by L. Buzzi at Schiaparelli Observatory (observatory code 204), at apparent magnitude 21.

Observations

Radar imagery
The close approach was studied with radar using Goldstone, the Green Bank Telescope, and the Arecibo Observatory.

Possible cometary origin 
The high orbital inclination and eccentricity suggest  may be an extinct comet that has shed its volatiles after numerous passes around the Sun. Orbital calculations by Petrus Jenniskens and Jérémie Vaubaillon showed that it was not expected to produce associated meteors in 2015.

If meteoroids related to this asteroid were to cross Earth's path, the radiant is expected to be near Northern Eridanus. Cameras for Allsky Meteor Surveillance (CAMS) did not detect any activity in the presumed area of the sky during 2013 and 2014. The object has a low albedo of 0.06, which is only slightly more than a typical comet that has an albedo of 0.03-0.05.

Notes

References

External links 

 ALERT! Bright NEO 2015 TB145 on 29–31 October 2015 Ian Musgrave (itelescope)
 WebCite archive of JPL solution #2 from 14 October 2015
 Halloween Asteroid is a Radar Science Treat (NASA Jet Propulsion Laboratory on YouTube)
 Halloween Asteroid 2015 TB145 Flyby Jerry Hilburn, 10/31/2015 12:12-12:24AM, Catfish Observatory, Teirra Del Sol, Canon 5D and an Orion ED 80 Refractor on an AVX Celestron Mount
 
 
 

Minor planet object articles (unnumbered)

Venus-crossing asteroids
Mercury-crossing asteroids

20151031
20151010